Woman's Weekly or Women's Weekly can refer to:

The Australian Women's Weekly
New Zealand Woman's Weekly
Woman's Weekly (UK magazine)